Robert Spain may refer to:

 Robert Hitchcock Spain (1925–2022), American bishop of the United Methodist Church
 Robert Spain (politician), American businessman and politician from Vermont